Zugura Yaganurovna Rakhmatullina (born 26 August 1961) is a Russian philosopher, stateswoman and politician from the United Russia party.

Education 
She graduated from Bashkir State University.

Political activities 
She represented the Beloretsk constituency in the State Duma from 2011 to 2021. She did not seek re-election at the 2021 Russian legislative election.

See also 

 List of members of the 7th Russian State Duma who were not re-elected

References 

Living people
1961 births
Bashkir State University alumni
21st-century Russian philosophers
21st-century Russian women politicians
Sixth convocation members of the State Duma (Russian Federation)
Seventh convocation members of the State Duma (Russian Federation)
United Russia politicians
People from Bashkortostan